Usmani or Othmani or Uthmani is a large Muslim community (Urdu: عثمانی), found mainly in South Asia. The word Usmani or (one and the same thing) is a surname. Usmani are found throughout South Asia mainly in India and Pakistan.

Notable people

Last name 
 Fazlur Rahman Usmani, Indian Muslim scholar
 Aziz-ul-Rahman Usmani, Indian Muslim scholar
 Shabbir Ahmad Usmani, Pakistani Muslim scholar
 Atiqur Rahman Usmani, Indian Muslim scholar
 Muhammad Rafi Usmani, Pakistani Muslim scholar
 Mufti Taqi Usmani, Pakistani Muslim scholar
 M. A. G. Osmani, Bengali military leader
 Sumayya Usmani, Pakistani-born Scottish food writer
Vjosa Osmani, fifth President of Kosovo
 Ghufran Usmani, SVP of Systems Ltd.
 Hassaan Usmani Son of Ghufran Usmani
Maskoor Usmani, Indian politician
Zeeshan-ul-hassan Usmani, Pakistani Computer Scientist / Data Scientist

Given name 
 Osmany Cienfuegos
 Osmani García
 Osmany Juantorena
 Osmani Urrutia

See also
 Abbasi (disambiguation)
 Alavi
 Behna
 Farooqi
 Gardezi
 Hashemi
 Quraishi
 Siddiqui

Surnames
Cuban given names
Usmani family